The 1941 Kansas Jayhawks football team was an American football team that represented the University of Kansas in the Big Six Conference during the 1941 college football season. In their third season under head coach Gwinn Henry, the Jayhawks compiled a 3–6 record (2–3 against conference opponents), finished in fourth place in the conference, and were outscored by opponents by a combined total of 222 to 74. They played their home games at Memorial Stadium in Lawrence, Kansas.

The team's statistical leaders included Ray Niblo with 241 rushing yards and 657 passing yards, Ray Evans with 235 receiving yards, and Denzel Gibbens with 18 points scored (three touchdowns). The Jayhawks had two players on the team more well known for accomplishments off the football field, politician Bob Dole and Naismith Memorial Basketball Hall of Fame coach Ralph Miller.

End Hub Ulrich was the team captain; Ulrich was also selected by the United Press as a first-team player on the 1941 All-Big Six Conference football team. Two other Kansas players (quarterback Ralph Miller and end Fred Preston) were named to the second team.

Schedule

References

Kansas
Kansas Jayhawks football seasons
Kansas Jayhawks football